Ensign John R. Monaghan (26 March 1873 – 1 April 1899) was an officer in the United States Navy.

Biography
Born in Chewelah, Washington Territory Monaghan was a part of the first graduating class of Gonzaga University, and ultimately graduated from the Naval Academy in June 1895. For the next two years, as a Passed Midshipman, he served in the cruiser , flagship of the U.S. Asiatic Station. Promoted to the rank of Ensign in July 1897, he was next assigned to the monitor  and gunboat , both of which operated along the West Coast of the Americas. In July 1898, during the Spanish–American War, he became an officer of the cruiser , which was then the Pacific Station's flagship.

In March 1899 Ensign Monaghan, onboard  Philadelphia, was sent to the troubled Samoan Islands. On 1 April, while serving ashore with a combined unit of British, Americans and Samoans, his force was ambushed by another group of rebel Samoans. When his unit's leader, Lieutenant Philip Lansdale, was wounded, Ensign Monaghan seized a rifle and attempted to rescue the injured officer.

The official report of the action stated: "The men were not in sufficient numbers to hold out any longer, and they were forced along by a fire which it was impossible to withstand. Ensign Monaghan did stand. He stood steadfast by his wounded superior and friend—one rifle against many, one brave man against a score of savages. He knew he was doomed. He could not yield. He died in heroic performance of duty."

Legacy
A statue commemorating his death was erected in 1906 in downtown Spokane, Washington. The inscription reads:
"During the retreat of the allied forces from the deadly fire and overwhelming number of the savage foe, he alone stood the fearful onslaught and sacrificed his life defending a wounded comrade Lieutenant Philip V. Lansdale United States Navy."

Legend has it that Monaghan's ghost haunts the Monaghan Music Mansion located on Gonzaga University's campus.

Namesake
Two ships, have been named for him.

See also
 Philip Lansdale
 Norman Edsall

References

1873 births
1899 deaths
United States Navy officers
American military personnel killed in action
People from Stevens County, Washington
Military personnel from Washington (state)
Gonzaga University alumni
United States Naval Academy alumni